All the Plans is Starsailor's fourth studio album. It was announced on 16 October 2008 and was released on 9 March 2009. The album was released via iTunes in the US on 28 April 2009.

Initially named All the Plans or Boy in Waiting, the album title was revealed on 16 October 2008. This release is Starsailor's first album with Virgin Records. Starsailor worked with Steve Osborne, who previously worked with the band on their debut album Love Is Here, and with engineer Dan Austin, who was also working with Doves on their fourth studio album Kingdom of Rust at the same time. Most of the information about the release of the album has been taken from the messages written by James Walsh on the band's MySpace page.

Background
The band recorded the album in Henley-on-Thames, and Richard Warren worked with the band in the studio. It was announced in February 2008 by James Walsh that the album was finished and that the band was mixing the album in a studio in Chiswick called "The Sofa Lounge." They were simultaneously "putting the finishing touches to a busy summer schedule."

Album style and direction
According to the band's MySpace messages, the new album would be a mixture between their heavier side and the romantic side shown in their previous albums. James said in an interview with the digital newspaper Scotsman.com: "I'm sure a lot of fans will be excited by the following: It's closer in spirit to the first album – it's got real soul to it. We've gone more for the emotional, tugging at the heartstrings approach. We went off on a bit of a rock tangent on the last album. It was good fun but it's time to get back to our roots."

On 21 March 2008, James Walsh wrote: There has been an emphasis on strong melodies and simple arrangements for this album and the guitar playing of Richard Warren has definitely enhanced the sound. I'm not one for slagging off the last album and saying this one is 100 times better because the last album definitely had its merits. However we have spent a lot longer writing and recording this one and the result is the perfect companion to Love Is Here.

According to Manchester Evening News, there isn't a particular theme to All the Plans but "married life and international politics are some of the key ingredients." Walsh said, "We've tried to write classic songs."

In an interview with James Oldham, Walsh commented that he thought the band had perhaps become a bit too defensive to media impressions: We wanted to prove people wrong. Working with Phil Spector on the second record [he actually only produced two tracks before he was fired] and then making a more American sounding rock record [2005's On the Outside] was just our way of trying to prove ourselves to our detractors. The new album is us realising that that was unnecessary and returning to the sound that we love and established us in the first place." 

The album was postponed one week in order not to clash with U2's then-forthcoming album, No Line on the Horizon. According to Walsh, when the band was recording a live session on Radio 2 on 13 January 2009, radio hosts Mark Radcliffe and Stuart Maconie highlighted the fact that Starsailor would release All the Plans on the same day as U2 and else suggest calling Bono and "toss a coin for who moves their release date." Bono called "heads" ,winning the toss, and so All the Plans was postponed for a week.

Reception

Initial critical response to All the Plans was generally favourable. According to Metacritic, which assigns a normalised rating out of 100 to reviews from mainstream critics, the album has received an average score of 62, based on 9 reviews.

On 5 February 2009, the newspaper Washington Square News posted the world's first review of All the Plans, giving a generally positive assessment. Kadeen Griffiths from Washington Square News wrote that: "The band's fourth studio album is both its first with Virgin Records and with Rolling Stones guitarist Ronnie Wood. The result is a cohesive blend of solid beats and fantastic harmonies. The addition of subtle, simple sounds like the tambourine on "Boy in Waiting" and the piano intro to "Change My Mind" gives the album a homey, personal feel. Tambourine and piano may not be the most innovative, but they provide a glimpse into the heart and soul of the band through their simple sounds."

On 13 February 2009, Nigel Goulds from Belfast Telegraph stated, "The band have served up another collection of heart-tugging tracks which again benefit from James Walsh's – who's based in Belfast much of the time – unique set of vocal cords. There's really nothing new to add to the Starsailor repertoire but when they produce songs of uncluttered grandeur they really are in a league of their own."

On 26 February 2009, The Guardian gave the album its first rave review, praising the quality of the songs, the emotional core, and Ron Wood's guitar work, summarising "With no one expecting it but themselves Starsailor have delivered." PopMatters called the lyrics "a rather pedestrian litany of breakup woes" but concurred that the melodies were well written and asserted that they, and most especially Walsh's vocals, more than made up for such flaws. They concluded "Starsailor are the most consistently good of the English pop troupes, with each of their efforts succeeding gracefully at what they attempt to accomplish."

On 8 March 2009, Dan Cairns from The Times claimed that, "What has changed is that the self-consciousness and anxiety that marred 2005's On the Outside has gone. On All the Plans, Starsailor sound like a band in love again with being a band," and added that "there is a real sense here of a band finally settling into their own skin, and rather liking the feeling."

On 9 March 2009, Andrew Hirst from the Huddersfield Daily Examiner said that, "Now nine years into their topsy turvy career, Starsailor have reached a new peak with an album of stunning elegance and presence."

On 12 March 2009, The Glaswegian named All the Plans as "album of the week," stating that, "After their last misfiring album, All the Plans can be seen as something of a comeback. It's also a return to form, as, while the Chorley lads may have lost a little ground, they've not lost their way with emotional, melodic music. The title track, which boasts an appearance from Rolling Stone Ronnie Wood, could be Oasis at their most anthemic, while James Walsh's voice has rarely sounded better than it does on "Hurts Too Much." The real stars of the show are the rootsy "Stars and Stripes" and the album's penultimate track "Listen Up," which might be the best song the band ever wrote."

However, Mojo wrote a negative review, stating that, "You try to remember a single melody or hook from the record and you're found wanting", while James Skinner of Drowned in Sound went as far as to single out the lyrics to 'Change My Mind', stating that "Starsailor are so wantonly unoriginal, so brazenly mediocre on every level, it's almost like they don’t even realise that they are and totally mean all this stuff." Entertainment.ie's review echoed these sentiments, remarking "If you're looking for any more reasons to dislike Starsailor, you'll find them in abundance on album number four, which is a continuation of the dull pub-rock sound that they've rarely deviated from during their nine-year career." Gillian Watson of The Skinny was yet another voice in this chorus, asserting that "The culprit here is frontman James Walsh, whose banal lyrics and achingly sincere vocals are a wearying and occasionally embarrassing listen."

Singles
The lead single "Tell Me It's Not Over" was released on 2 March 2009. The song has been played in various gigs since 2007 while they were recording their new album. "All the Plans" was officially announced by the band as the album's second single on 16 April 2009. The song was released as a digital download on 22 June 2009.

All the Plans Tour
On 2 December 2008, Starsailor announced their first tour in four years to support the album. According to the official website, the All the Plans tour "is about to be sold out." On 3 June 2009, it was confirmed on their official site that the band will tour Germany, else adding that they were waiting to confirm more tour dates.

Track listing

Deluxe edition

A deluxe edition of All the Plans was simultaneously released, featuring a bonus disc of acoustic versions (including the new track "Merry Go Round").

Chart positions

Personnel
 Vocals: James Walsh
 Guitars: James Walsh, Richard Warren, and Ronnie Wood
 Keyboards: Barry Westhead
 Bass: James 'Stel' Stelfoz
 Drums: Ben Byrne

Production
 Producer: Steve Osborne
 Mastering: Bob Ludwig and Andy "Hippy" Baldwin
 Engineer: Scott McCornick
 Management: Andrew, Martin, Steve and Claire
 Design: Joe Hollick
 Artwork: Daniel Meadows
 A&R: Chris Briggs
 Tea and sympathy: Barriemore Barlow

References

2009 albums
Starsailor (band) albums
Albums produced by Steve Osborne
Virgin Records albums